Josh Mitchell (born 8 June 1984) is an Australian former soccer player who played as a central defender.

Club career
Josh Mitchell was born in Belmont, Newcastle, and began playing football at the age of 4 at Swansea Swans Soccer Club and was selected for the Australian School Boys Football team in 2002. His professional career commenced in the 2002/2003 season with Newcastle United Jets, where he made his debut against NSL champions Perth Glory. In the 2003/2004 season Mitchell went on to become a regular starter in the Newcastle United side. After a brief stint with The Central Coast in the NSW Premier league, Mitchell signed in July 2005 with Romanian club FC Universitatea Craiova.

In his first season with FC Universitatea Craiova, Mitchell started in 26 games helping the club in promotion back to the Liga I in Romania. On 15 April 2010 it was confirmed that Mitchell along with his FC Universitatea Craiova Michael Baird had returned home to sign for A league side Perth Glory. Then Mitchell played for his home club Newcastle Jets after signing a two-year deal on 28 June 2012.

On 25 June 2014, Mitchell transferred to Chinese Super League side Liaoning Whowin.

On 7 July 2016, Mitchell signed with Hong Kong Premier League club Eastern.

A-League career statistics

Titles

Other interests

In 2015 Josh started a travel website which focuses better travel experience and a health website for improving health. This project aims to help in transitioning to life after professional football.

References

External links
 
 OzFootball profile
 
 
 
 

1984 births
Living people
Australian soccer players
Australian expatriate soccer players
National Soccer League (Australia) players
Liga I players
Expatriate footballers in Romania
Australian expatriate sportspeople in Romania
FC U Craiova 1948 players
Newcastle Jets FC players
Perth Glory FC players
Eastern Sports Club footballers
A-League Men players
Liaoning F.C. players
Chinese Super League players
Expatriate footballers in China
Association football defenders